The St Helens R.F.C. – Wigan Warriors rivalry is a historic local rivalry between the rugby league clubs St Helens and the Wigan Warriors, based in North West England. The rivalry is born out of relative proximity of the two towns, but as two of the most successful clubs in British rugby it has become a marquee event in the calendar.

The sporting term of "Derby" or "Derbies" as used in all other sporting rivalries originates from this sporting fixture as a result of its early association with the Earl of Derby Stanley family.

Initially at least one fixture was played on Boxing Day annually and was known as the Boxing Day Derby, later the second fixture settled on Good Friday. Following the leagues decision to move the competition from winter to the summer the Good Friday Derby remains the one  traditionally fixed game in the calendar.

History

 

 
St Helens and Wigan are two of the original twenty-two northern rugby clubs that broke away from the Rugby Football Union to form the Northern Union in 1895, which gave birth to the modern day sport of rugby league. The two clubs first encounter in the newly formed league was in the first season of the new code. The fixture was played at St Helens' Knowsley Road ground and ended in a 0-0 draw. The clubs have since faced each other over 300 times in all competitions, and the rivalry has grown to become rugby league's biggest derby encounter.
 
Over the years the two clubs have become very successful. Wigan are the most successful club in British rugby league, having won 22 league titles and 19 Challenge Cups. St Helens are the second most successful team with 16 league titles and 12 Challenge Cup wins. In rugby league grand finals, the clubs have contested four league championship matches with St Helens claiming the title at Wigan's expense on three occasions (1971, 2000 and 2014) to Wigan's one grand final success over Saints in 2010.

Traditional dates
In keeping with tradition, derby fixtures within the RFL have usually been played on Boxing Day and Good Friday. Since the move to summer seasons in 1996, Boxing Day games have no longer been competitive and has seen events like Leeds's and Wakefield's Festive Challenge emerge in keeping with the Boxing Day tradition. The Super League however has kept to the tradition of having derbies on Good Friday with St Helens and Wigan not competing a Good Friday Derby on only three occasions since the summer switch.

The Original Sporting Derby
 
The term "Derby" applied to only two sporting events originally. The 19th Earl of Derby, confirmed that his family had lent their name to two sporting events - the horserace at Epsom and the Rugby League Fixtures between Wigan and St Helens. With the town of Wigan at one end of their Knowsley estate and the town of St Helens at the other, he named the fixture "The Derby". This fixture then became widely known as "The Derby" with other games between local rivals in various sports adopting the term.

Head to Head
Statistics correct as of 29/1/21
 
In all competitions, competitive and uncompetitive:

Matches by competition

Meetings in major finals
1953–54 Lancashire Cup Final: St Helens 16–8 Wigan
1960–61 Challenge Cup Final: St Helens 12–6 Wigan
1965–66 Challenge Cup Final: St Helens 21–2 Wigan
1970–71 NFRL Division One Championship Final: St Helens 16–12 Wigan
1984–85 Lancashire Cup Final: St Helens 26–18 Wigan
1988–89 Challenge Cup Final: Wigan 27–0 St Helens
1990–91 Challenge Cup Final: Wigan 13–8 St Helens
1991–92 Premiership Final: Wigan 48–16 St Helens
1992–93 Charity Shield: St Helens 17–0 Wigan
1992–93 Lancashire Cup Final: Wigan 5–4 St Helens
1992–93 Premiership Final: St Helens 10–4 Wigan
1995–96 League Cup Final: Wigan 48–16 St Helens
1996 Premiership Final: Wigan 25–16 St Helens
1997 Premiership Final: Wigan 32–20 St Helens
2000 Super League Grand Final: St Helens 29–16 Wigan
2002 Challenge Cup Final: Wigan 21–12 St Helens
2004 Challenge Cup Final: St Helens 32–16 Wigan
2010 Super League Grand Final: Wigan 22–10 St Helens
2014 Super League Grand Final: St Helens 14–6 Wigan
2020 Super League Grand Final: St Helens 8–4 Wigan

Collective Honours

As of the 2022 regular season

See also
 Derbies in the Rugby Football League

Notes

References
 
General
http://wigan.rlfans.com/readarticle.php?article_id=1824
 
Inline
 

 

 

St Helens R.F.C.
Wigan Warriors
Rugby league rivalries
Sports rivalries in the United Kingdom